The Nyhem Week is a major annual conference by the Swedish Pentecostal Movement. It occurs during the Midsummer week every year in Nyhem in Mullsjö Municipality, Sweden. It was first held in 1917. It is hosted by the Mullsjö-Nyhem Pentecostal Congregation.

Until 2008 the conference were held inside a large tent. Since 2009 the conference has been instead held inside Nyhemshallen.

See also
Vineyard Norden Summercamp

References 

1917 establishments in Sweden
June events
Mullsjö Municipality
Recurring events established in 1917
Swedish Pentecostal Movement
Evangelical Christian conferences